Shahrak-e Sartang-e Bijar (also Romanized as Shahrak-e Sartang-e Bījār) is a village in Boli Rural District, Chavar District, Ilam County, Ilam Province, Iran. At the 2006 census, its population was 68, in 14 families. The village is populated by Kurds.

References 

Populated places in Ilam County
Kurdish settlements in Ilam Province